The 1958 Humboldt State Lumberjacks football team represented Humboldt State College during the 1958 NCAA College Division football season. Humboldt State competed in the Far Western Conference (FWC).

The 1958 Lumberjacks were led by eighth-year head coach Phil Sarboe. They played home games at the Redwood Bowl in Arcata, California. Humboldt State finished with a record of seven wins, two losses and one tie (7–2–1, 3–2 FWC). The Lumberjacks outscored their opponents 176–109 for the season.

Schedule

Notes

References

Humboldt State
Humboldt State Lumberjacks football seasons
Humboldt State Lumberjacks football